Cucerdea is a commune in Mureș County, Transylvania, Romania. It is composed of three villages: Bord (Bord), Cucerdea, and Șeulia de Mureș (Oláhsályi).

The commune is located in the southwestern part of the county, in the center of the Transylvanian Plateau, between the rivers Mureș and Târnava Mică. 

According to the 2011 Census, the commune has a population of 1,525, of which 97.18% are ethnic Romanians.

See also
List of Hungarian exonyms (Mureș County)

References

Communes in Mureș County
Localities in Transylvania